Javid David Álvarez Fernández (born December 13, 1983), known simply as J Álvarez, is a Puerto Rican reggaeton singer, best known for hit singles such as "Junto Al Amanecer", "La Pregunta", and "Esa Boquita".

Both of his parents are immigrants from the Dominican Republic and moved to Puerto Rico before Alvarez was born. He has shot many music videos in Colombia and toured Europe and the US, which has helped him gain popularity.

Musical career

Career Beginnings 
Alvarez was born in Rio Piedras, Puerto Rico. His mother and father are both from the Dominican Republic. When Alvarez was 12 years old he sang in front of several of his classmates and teachers, his first-ever song "Lo Que Ella Trae" (What She Brings). 

As a child, he listened to many reggaeton and hip hop artists, and his music was inspired by Tego Calderon and Busta Rhymes. Then, through his cousin, he met with DJ Nelson, and a working chemistry soon emerged between the two. He was then signed to Flow Music in 2009. Later that year, his debut mixtape El Dueño Del Sistema was released, which included collaborations with several high-profile artists such as De La Ghetto, Jowell & Randy, and Ñejo & Dalmata. He followed this release with a second mixtape, titled El Movimiento: The Mixtape, which was released on September 12, 2010.

2011-2015: Otro Nivel de Musica, De Camino Pa' La Cima 
Otro Nivel De Musica, his debut studio album, was released on September 20, 2011, and featured the hit singles "La Pregunta" and "Junto Al Amanecer", which both charted on the Billboard Hot Latin Songs chart and became the singer's first songs to chart.  A special edition was later released on May 1, 2012, titled Otro Nivel De Musica Reloaded. This album was very well received among fans and was nominated for Best Urban Music Album at the 2012 Latin Grammy Awards. In 2014, "La Pregunta" was nominated for Urban Song of the Year at the 26th Lo Nuestro Awards.

On February 18, 2014, he released his third studio album entitled De Camino Pa' La Cima, which would debut at #2 in its second week on Top Latin Albums, and reached the top spot on the Latin Rhythm Albums chart. It features collaborations from Mackie, Zion, and Daddy Yankee. On January 27, 2015, J Álvarez released De Camino Pa' La Cima Reloaded, his fourth studio album, which features Cosculluela and Wisin. This album also reached the #1 spot on Top Latin Rhythm Albums and held that position for about a month.

2016-present: Big Yauran and La Fama Que Camina 
In September 2016, he released his third studio album - Big Yauran, which reached the number 8 spot on Top Latin Rhythm Albums. In addition, one of the singles from the album, "Haters", charted on Hot Latin Songs.

In March 2018, he released another album titled La Fama Que Camina, which includes popular charting singles such as "Esa Boquita", "De La Mia Personal", and "Rico Suave". In November 2018, the Recording Industry Association of America certified that the single "De La Mia Personal" had reached gold/platinum status.

On April 24, 2019, Alvarez headlined the Billboard Sounds Showcase in Las Vegas. On March 5, 2021, he collaborated on a single titled "Billete" with Marie Monti and Mariah Angeliq.

Discography 

Albums
 2011: Otro Nivel De Música
 2012: Otro Nivel de Musica Reloaded
 2014: De Camino Pa' La Cima
 2015: De Camino Pa' La Cima Reloaded
 2016: Big Yauran
 2018: La Fama Que Camina
 2020: Big Yauran 2
 2020: El Jonson (Side A)
 2020: El Jonson (Side B)
 2020: El Jonson
 2021: El Johnson (Deluxe Edition)
 2021: El Jonson Reloaded

Mixtapes & EPs
 2009: El Dueño Del Sistema
 2009: El Dueño del Sistema: Special Edition
 2010: El Movimiento: The Mixtape
 2012: Imperio Nazza: J Alvarez Edition
 2013: Intocable The Mixtape'''
 2015: Le Canta Al Amor 2019: La Fama Que Camina EP
 2019: La Fama Que Camina, Vol. 1.5 2019: La Fama Que Camina, Vol. 2''

References

External links 
 

1983 births
Living people
People from Río Piedras, Puerto Rico
21st-century Puerto Rican male singers
Puerto Rican reggaeton musicians
Puerto Rican people of Dominican Republic descent
Latin trap musicians